Robert M. Levine (1941 – April 1, 2003) was an American historian,  Gabelli Senior Scholar in the Arts and Sciences, Director of Latin American Studies, and professor of history at the University of Miami.

His  interests were related to Latin America, in particular, Brazilian cultural and political history, Jewish diasporas in Latin America, Cuban history, and Latin American history in general.

Biography
Robert M. Levine was born to David and Ruth Levine and grew up in New York City. After graduating with High Honors from Colgate University, he obtained his Ph.D. from Princeton University.

Levine died of cancer, leaving behind his two sons, Joey and David.

Books
1970: The Vargas Regime: The Critical Years, 1934-1938 (from Ph.D. thesis)
1980: Portuguese translation: O regime de Vargas, nonfiction best-seller for 12 weeks
1995: Vale of Tears: Revisiting the Canudos Massacre in Northeastern Brazil
1989: Images of History: Nineteenth and Early Twentieth Century Latin American Photographs as Documents
1990: Cuba in the 1850s: Through the Lens of Charles DeForest Fredricks
1994: Tropical Diaspora: the Jewish Experience in Cuba, 1902-1992
1994: (with Jose Carlos Sebe) Cinderela Negra: A Saga de Carolina Maria de Jesus
1995: (with Jose Carlos Sebe) The Life and Death of Carolina Maria de Jesus
1997: Brazilian Legacies
1998: Father of the Poor? Vargas and His Era.  New York: Cambridge University Press,1998. 
1999:The History of Brazil (nonacademic; for general audience)
2000: (with Moises Asis) Cuban Miami'. New Brunswick, NJ: Rutgers Univ. Press, 2000. 'ISBN 0-8135-2780-5
2001: Secret Missions to Cuba: Fidel Castro, Bernardo Benes, and Cuban MiamiCambridge Concise History of Cuba'', left as manuscript; posthumously revisited by prof. Frank Mora

References

1941 births
2003 deaths
20th-century American historians
American male non-fiction writers
University of Miami faculty
Colgate University alumni
Princeton University alumni
Historians from New York (state)
Brazilianists
Historians from Florida
20th-century American male writers